Lakbima was a Sri Lankan private Sinhala language newspaper which was owned by the Sumathi News Papers Limited. Chairmen of the organization is Mileena Sumathipala, wife of the late D.W. Sumathipala. The English version of this newspaper was called Lakbima News. "Lakbima Irida Sangrahaya" was a weekend newspaper published on Sunday. It is established in 1994.

The newspaper includes local, foreign, sports and entertainment news. Lakbima News Papers is the main sponsor of the annual Sumathi Teledrama Award Ceremony.

See also
List of newspapers in Sri Lanka

References

External links
BBC Sri Lanka media

Publications established in 1994
Sinhala-language newspapers published in Sri Lanka
Sumathi Newspapers
Sunday newspapers published in Sri Lanka
1994 establishments in Sri Lanka